Tetanoptera leucodactyla is a species of fly in the family Sciomyzidae, the only species in the genus Tetanoptera. It is found in the Oriental Region.

References

Sciomyzidae
Insects described in 1950
Diptera of Africa
Monotypic insect genera